Stąporków  is a town with 6,200 inhabitants in Końskie County, Świętokrzyskie Voivodeship, Poland. The town belongs to the historic province of Lesser Poland.

History
The town's name is probably derived from the name of the owner, Stąpor. In the past, it also used to be called Stomporków.

The history of Stąporków dates back to the mid-16th century, and is associated with early ironworks, which was part of the Old-Polish Industrial Region. It was a private village, administratively located in the Żarnów County in the Sandomierz Voivodeship in the Lesser Poland Province of the Polish Crown. In 1738–1739 a blast furnace was built here by Polish Crown Chancellor Jan Małachowski. In 1781, Count Friedrich Wilhelm von Reden, a German pioneer in mining and metallurgy, visited Stąporków. At that time, the village's furnace produced a hundredweight of pig iron per week, more than similar plants in Upper Silesia. In 1838 the Małachowski family expanded and modernized the plant. An old blast furnace was replaced by two modern ones. Between 1876 and 1895, new upgrades and expansions of the plant took place. 

Despite the widespread destruction and requisition of equipment during World War I, the plant operated until 1938, and the buildings survived until 1945, when they were destroyed during heavy fighting. During the German occupation (World War II), on April 4, 1940, German gendarmes committed a massacre of the family of Marian Gut, an 18-year-old soldier of the local Polish resistance. In the massacre, his parents, 12-year-old brother and 2-year-old sister were murdered and the family's house was burned down. There is a memorial at the site.

After World War II, the local industry was reopened, and iron ore mining was initiated. The iron foundry in 1961 employed 1,100 people, and Stąporków population increased from 700 in 1946 to 3,472 in 1961. In 1967 Stąporków received municipal rights, and in the late 1960s, a Health Centre, a Gymnasium, and a sports hall were built.

References

Cities and towns in Świętokrzyskie Voivodeship
Końskie County
Sandomierz Voivodeship
Radom Governorate
Kielce Voivodeship (1919–1939)
Łódź Voivodeship (1919–1939)
Nazi war crimes in Poland